The 2011 Uzbekistan First League was the 20th season of 2nd level football in Uzbekistan since 1992. It is split in an Eastern and Western zone, each featuring 12 teams.

Teams and locations

Competition format

League consists of two regional groups: zone "East" and "West". The season comprises two phases. The first phase consists of a regular home-and-away schedule: each team plays the other teams twice. 
The top eight teams of the first phase from each zone will be merged in one tournament and compete for the championship.  The bottom four teams of each zone after first phase will be directly relegated to 2nd division. 

After matchday 6, Shurchi Lochin started tournament in Zone "West", officially withdrew from the competition in Mai, 2011, due to lack of financing. Because team played less than half of its games, all team's results are canceled.

First phase

Zone "West"

Zone "East"

Second phase

League table

Top goalscorers

Last updated: 1 November 2011
Source: Uzbekistan First League

References

External links
Championat.uz: Standings and results
pfl.uz: First league results
Soccerway.com; Standings, Fixtures & Results

Uzbekistan Pro League seasons
2
Uzbek
Uzbek

uz:O'zbekiston Professional Futbol Ligasining 1-Liga Sharq Mintaqasi